Electroretard is the thirteenth album by the Melvins, which was released in 2001 through Man's Ruin Records. The album contains an experiment in backmasking ("Shit Storm"), three covers and four reworked versions of old Melvins songs. Although released on CD, it was going to see an LP release, but Man's Ruin closed beforehand. It was later re-issued on June 2, 2015, together with The Bulls & the Bees EP via Ipecac Recordings.

Track listing

Track information
"Shit Storm" – The song "Revolve" from Stoner Witch reversed with added effects and drums. The version used was from Stoner Witch and not the version found on this release. Samples of other Melvins songs put in reverse can be heard as well. On the re-issue, the track has been shortened drastically.
"Youth of America" – Wipers cover. Later released on the 2010 12" EP "Sludge Glamorous"
"Gluey Porch Treatments" – Re-recording of the song "Gluey Porch Treatments" from Gluey Porch Treatments.
"Revolve" – Remake of the song from Stoner Witch. Later released as a single with a live version of "With Teeth".
"Missing" – Cows cover. The song was later released on vinyl as a 7" split with Hepa-Titus in 2014.
"Lovely Butterflies" – Re-recording of the song from Honky.
"Tipping the Lion" – Remix of the song from Stag. Previously released on the Interstellar Overdrive 10".
"Interstellar Overdrive" – Pink Floyd cover.  Previously released on the Interstellar Overdrive 10".

Personnel
Buzz Osborne – vocals, guitar and RMS 2000
Dale Crover – drums, backing vocals, organ and RMS 2000
Kevin Rutmanis – bass guitar, backing vocals, slide bass, string arrangement and RMS 2000
Mark Deutrom – bass guitar (tracks 7 & 8; credited on re-release)

Additional personnel
Tim Green – engineer (tracks 1–6)
Michael Rozon – mixing (tracks 1–6)
Joe Barresi – engineer & mixing (tracks 7–8)
John Golden – mastering
Frank Kozik –artwork

References

Melvins albums
2001 albums
Man's Ruin Records albums
Albums produced by Joe Barresi
Sludge metal albums